Paul Winter (born 1939) is an American jazz saxophonist.

Paul Winter may also refer to:

Paul Winter (writer) (1904–1969), Moravian-born Czechoslovakian barrister and author
Paul Winter (athlete) (1906–1992), French athlete, primarily in the discus throw
Paul Winter (violinist) (1914–1992), New York virtuoso violinist

See also
Paul Wynter (1935–2019), Antiguan and Barbudan bodybuilder
Paul Winters (disambiguation)